Zıxır (also, Zuxur and Zykhyr) is a village and municipality in the Quba Rayon of Azerbaijan.  It has a population of 462.  The municipality consists of the villages of Zıxır, Dalıqaya, and Gürdəh.

References

External links

Populated places in Quba District (Azerbaijan)